Charles Allen (April 17, 1827 – January 13, 1913) was an American jurist.

Early life and education
Allen was born at Greenfield, Massachusetts to Sylvester and Harriet (Ripley) Allen. Allen graduated from Harvard University in 1847 and studied law. He received the degree of LL.D. from Harvard in 1892.

Legal career
Allen was admitted to the bar in 1850 and practiced law at Greenfield for twelve years, then advanced to state offices, serving as the Massachusetts Attorney General from 1867 to 1872. During his sixteen years of service (1882–1898) on the bench of the Massachusetts Supreme Judicial Court, he became known as one of the most eminent jurists of his day.

Works
Allen's publications include:
 Allen's Reports (14 vols., 1861–1867)
 Telegraph Cases (1900)
 Notes on the Bacon-Shakespeare Question (1900)

Notes

References
 
 
 
 
 
 

1827 births
1913 deaths
Harvard Law School alumni
Massachusetts state court judges
Massachusetts Attorneys General
Justices of the Massachusetts Supreme Judicial Court
Massachusetts lawyers
19th-century American people
People from Greenfield, Massachusetts
19th-century American judges
19th-century American lawyers